The following is a list of 2020 box office number-one films in France.

References

2020
France
2020 in French cinema